Daniel Escalona (born February 4, 1982) is an Aruban football player. He played for amateur sides and has played twice for the Aruba national team.

Club career
Escalona played for the Dutch amateur side DOTO in Pernis. He ended up with DOTO in the 5th tier of Dutch football after a three-year injury lay-off and spells with SVV Scheveningen and VV GOZ.

International career
Escalona has played twice for the Aruba national team.

National team statistics

References

External links

1982 births
Living people
Aruban footballers
SVV Scheveningen players
SV Racing Club Aruba players
SV Bubali players
Association football defenders
Aruba international footballers